Skulduggery Pleasant: Death Bringer is a young adult fantasy novel written by Irish playwright Derek Landy and published in September 2011. It is the sixth of the Skulduggery Pleasant series and sequel to Skulduggery Pleasant: Mortal Coil.

The story follows the sorcerer and detectives Valkyrie Cain and Skulduggery Pleasant as they deal with the supposed emergence of the Death Bringer, the return of Lord Vile and the growing coming of Darquesse. The book was released in the US and Canada in 2018. HarperCollins Audio publishes the unabridged CD sets of the books read by Rupert Degas.

Plot summary

Vandameer Craven has Melancholia trapped in the lower levels of the Temple undergoing the surge, and is in pain, but Craven insists soon she will be strong enough to be the Death Bringer.

Kenny Dunne, a reporter finds himself embroiled in a murder case after Paul Lynch, the homeless man with sensitive powers he was going to interview, is found dead. He is interrogated by Detective Inspector Me (Skulduggery) and a girl (Valkyrie), who start out with honest questions but they change to Skulduggery's wit, however they find out that Paul Lynch was in contact with Bernadette Maguire. Upon the Detectives leaving the room with Fletcher, another officer comes in and tells him there is no Detective Inspector Me.

Meanwhile, Valkyrie attends the christening of her sister Alison (sometimes referred to as Alice for short) and talks with the Toxic Twins about magic until Fletcher arrives and tells her Skulduggery has found Bernadette's cottage, and the two teleport there to find her dead, and Skulduggery picks up traces of Adept Magic with Rainbow Dust. They catch sight of the killer, a bald man with a stupid goatee beard, but before they can give chase, he drops a box containing the unbeatable Jitter Girls to distract them while he escapes.

In the Necromancer Temple, Cleric Vandameer Craven is late to a meeting in the high priest's office and he recounts how he hates them all, except for Nathanial Quiver, who has done nothing wrong to him. Wreath discusses Valkyrie's rise to become the Death Bringer, but Craven suggests Melancholia St Clair and is laughed at, and they continue to hope Valkyrie is Death Bringer. Craven is shown to be slightly unstable as he returns to the lower levels and begins to free Melancholia as he thinks showing her the abilities he gave her would grant her to be the Death Bringer.

Meanwhile, back at the Cottage, Skulduggery and Valkyrie desperately hold off the Jitter Girls, until one manages to stick her hand in Valkyrie's brain, and unleashes Darquesse, who attacks the Jitter Girls and forces them to retreat back to their box. Skulduggery attempts to talk to Darquesse, and Valkyrie returns as Fletcher arrives ready to fight. They tell him it's over and she and Fletcher teleport back to her home where they step out from behind a tree all muddy, to have all the Christening guests stare at them.

China Sorrows is called to the Church of the Faceless Ones to meet Prave, but instead her old friend Eliza Scorn emerges and tells her when she murdered Remus Crux because of her secret that she led Skulduggery's family to death, Prave snuck after them and heard her secret and has told Eliza. Eliza decides to use the information to blackmail her into helping lift the religion of the faceless back to its notoriety once more. China agrees and leaves, thinking how to kill them both. Back at her library, Skulduggery and Valkyrie arrive and they discuss the man in possession of the Jitter Girls, until conversation turns to the Requiem Ball, and ultimately to Valkyrie's relationship with Fletcher and the other man in her life. China then tells the two of them the Necromancers believe they have their Death Bringer, Melancholia St Clair.

Wreath is observing Melancholia after she is revealed and discusses how weak she looks with Quiver.

Valkyrie and Skulduggery travel to Roarhaven to visit the Sanctuary and Valkryie saves an American Tourist family from a horrible shop keeper who despises Mortals. They continue to the Sanctuary and meet the Elders.They discuss Melancholia being the Death Bringer and Elder Mist says that the Necromancers pose as no threat toward them. However, Grand Mage Ravel and Elder Ghastly agree that it is worth checking out as they need to stop people from dying. The Sanctuary gives them more resources to find out what they need to know about the Passage .

Skulduggery and Valkyrie visit the Necromancer Temple and find out that the bald man with the stupid goatee is called Dragonclaw and is a Necromancer. They see him and he runs away. They get into a car chase and Dragonclaw crashes and runs away. Skulduggery and Valkyrie encounter a Warlock hired by Dragonclaw, which is a very dangerous sorcerer that grows stronger from feasting on people and Skulduggery thought they were extinct. Skulduggery and Valkyrie manage to defeat him and Valkyrie returns home. She meets Caelan there and we find out that Valkyrie is cheating on Fletcher and she kisses Caelan.

Meanwhile, Melancholia has taken some more tests and finds out that after 20 minutes she will be back to full strength.  Hearing this, she says she will "have some fun," and leaves.

Late at night, Alison wakes Valkyrie up and she invites Fletcher over. The reflection comes out of the mirror without Valkyrie letting it but it insists that Valkyrie only told it to go back in the mirror, but she didn't touch the glass. It starts laughing at her with Fletcher. While Fletcher is out getting pizza, Melancholia comes to Valkyrie's house and even though Caelan tries to save her, Melancholia takes Valkyrie shadow-walking. Melancholia cuts Valkyrie all over with the shadows and leaves her unconscious and bloody. Valkyrie calls Fletcher and he takes her to the Sanctuary.

It turns out that Nye is the new sanctuary doctor and has been hired by Madame Mist. Skulduggery wants to shoot it but Nye says that if he kills it then Valkyrie will die because the injuries Melancholia inflicted are life-threatening and he has already figured out how to save her. And that by the time another doctor figures it out, Valkyrie will be dead. Skulduggery is furious with Melancholia and claims that he is going to go after her. Ghastly says he can't and instead they decide to issue an arrest warrant and if she doesn't give herself up, then Skulduggery can 'do what needs to be done'.

Valkyrie wakes up and tries to threaten Nye. However, Nye knows that Valkyrie is somehow involved with Darquesse due to the mutterings and hallucinations as it performed on her to seal her true name. It says that if she tells the sanctuary about the experiments he has been conducting, he will tell the Elders about her involvement in it all and it would raise all sorts of ' awkward questions'.

Skulduggery takes Valkyrie to his house and tells her the story of his family crest and why he abandoned it.

Meanwhile, Scapegrace and Thrasher are travelling around in and ice-cream van, on the way to Nye's warehouse. He's not there but Clarabelle is. She has dyed her hair blue and Scapegrace recognises her and she recognises him. She agrees to show them to the Sanctuary so they can ask Nye to cure them. Clarabelle is also looking for a job.

Skulduggery, along with Sanctuary agents, breaks into the Temple and shows an arrest warrant for Melancholia. Craven refuses and before Skulduggery leaves, he threatens Craven by saying that the Temple will be raided if they do not give up Melancholia.

Meanwhile, Kenny's investigations take him to Finbar Wrong. He claims that there were rumours that Finbar can use Magic. Finbar denies this, and refers Kenny to Geoffery Scrutinious. Geoffery uses his powers to make Kenny forget all the Magic. However, when Kenny is about to throw all his reports away, he somehow manages to remember everything.

China is visited by Jaron Gallow, who claims he has earned Eliza's trust, but is secretly working against her. The two agree to become allies to destroy the Church of the Faceless. Gallow would retrieve a list of twelve names who follow the Church of the Faceless. China then visits the Church a few days after to meet with Eliza again, who reveals Gallow to her. The three agree to meet during the Requiem Ball.

Scapegrace, Thrasher and Clarabelle arrive at the Sanctuary and they visit Nye. It gives Clarabelle a job as its assistant after Nye discovers that Clarabelle killed Kenspeckle Grouse. However, it decides not to help the Zombies as they have nothing to offer it. Furious at this, Scapegrace goes to his old bar, where the new owner reluctantly agrees to give the Zombies a job at the bar.

The next day, Valkyrie and Skulduggery, aided by many Cleavers and agents, prepare to raid the Temple to arrest Melancholia. Bored, and after receiving a call, the two leave for the airport as Dragonclaw had been sighted there. They manage to find him and after a small torture, he reveals that back-up Necromancers are soon to arrive to help the Temple. Alone, Valkyrie manages to sneak into the arrivals area, and succeeds in stalling the Necromancers. They take Dragonclaw back into the Temple, where he takes them inside a secret tunnel into the Temple. Skulduggery knocks out Dragonclaw, and he and Valkyrie split up to find Melancholia. Valkyrie runs into Wreath, who reveals the true intentions of the Passage. Three billion people will be killed, which will stop anyone from being born, and anyone from dying. Valkyrie tries to stop him, but he knocks her out.

Valkyrie wakes up to find Skulduggery next to her, who has also been captured. Auron Tenebrae, the High Priest, walks into the room and tells a story which happened during the War. He reveals that Skulduggery came back to life thanks to Tenebrae adding Magic to Serpine's right hand. He then reveals that Skulduggery was Lord Vile during the War, leaving Valkyrie shocked. Tenebrae leaves and visits Melancholia, where he finds out that she is not actually the Death Bringer and Craven really performed on her. However, before he can try to stop her and Craven, she easily kills Tenebrae.

Dragonclaw is allowed to torture Skulduggery and Valkyrie, but the two work together to defeat Dragonclaw. As they attempt to escape the Temple, they run into Melancholia, who has taken the lives of other Necromancers. Unable to defeat Melancholia, Skulduggery is forced to unleash Lord Vile's armour. He easily manages to beat Melancholia, and is just about to kill her when other Necromancers arrive, forcing Vile armour to turn back to Skulduggery. Melancholia, Craven and the other Necromancers manage to escape. The Necromancers who have fled to Widow Hill meet and discuss what to do next. Outside the Temple, Valkyrie leaves Skulduggery as she is still shocked from the revelation.

When Valkyrie arrives home, she finds no one. She dials her Reflection and it tells her that Melissa was mugged by a man called Ian Moore. Blinded by rage, Valkyrie breaks into the cell Ian is being held in and brutally attacks Ian. Just as she is about to kill him, she regains her senses and flees from the police station. The next morning, Valkyrie is visited by Fletcher, who has been concerned with Valkyrie. An argument ensues between them and they break up. Valkyrie is later visited by Carol and Crystal that day, and Valkyrie finally accepts to teach the twins Magic, although they do not succeed. Their father, Fergus, shows up and sends the twins home. He then starts shouting at Valkyrie that Magic is ruining their family and that he knew all along about Magic. As he leaves, Valkyrie asks if Fergus can do Magic. He clicks his fingers and generates a spark, although it is weak. Valkyrie visits Gordon to tell him to tell him about the things Fergus told her.

The next day Valkyrie is visited by Skulduggery again, and she finally forgives him for his past. They begin to discuss how to deal with Melancholia, and he suggests they should let Vile kill Melancholia.

Fletcher, who is still upset over the break-up, visits Ghastly and asks for advice over what to do next. Ghastly tells Fletcher to not give up on Valkyrie, but not to go begging for her back.

Back at Widow Hill, Wreath realises that Melancholia is unstable, and Quiver tells him that Craven plans to kill Wreath, so Wreath decides to kill Craven first. But as he tries, he is forced to escape as the White Cleaver intervenes. He decides to aid the Sanctuary is taking down Melancholia, so he locates Valkyrie and Skulduggery and informs them of the location of the Necromancers. They create a plan to storm into the house and kill Melancholia with the aid of Fletcher. When they teleport into the house, Craven accidentally slices Melancholia in half using his shadows after attempting to slice Valkyrie. The Necromancers retreat, and Valkyrie and Skulduggery return home.

The next day Valkyrie spends time with her mother, father and sister Alice. When Valkyrie is left alone with Alice, Ian Moore manages to sneak into the home and attack Valkyrie after the police disallowed him to be beaten up any further while in a cell. She manages to touch her mirror and lets the Reflection out, and it defeats Ian. The Reflection suggests killing Ian, but Valkyrie rejects this and instead calls the police. Valkyrie is then taken to a mortal hospital where she is stitched up. At Roarhaven, Scapegrace opens his old pub for work, but nobody shows up. Instead, Craven and the other Necromancers enter the pub and take control of Scapegrace and Thrasher because they are Zombies. Craven tells the two that they have a task to steal a disc from the Elders' offices. Scapegrace manages to steal it and gives it to Craven, who orders the Zombies to create a new Zombie Horde.

Before the Requiem Ball, Skulduggery gives a dress to Valkyrie to wear. When they arrive at Gordon's estate (the place the Ball is held), they are greeted by Dexter Vex, an ex-member of the Dead Men . Other faces, such as China and Gordon also talk to them. During the party a group of robbers try to steal from Gordon's house, unaware they all have Magic. The sorcerers easily defeat the robbers.

Meanwhile, in the Caves, the new Zombie Horde are slowly decreasing as they run into monsters during their task. The Necromancers are also at the Ball outside the estate, where they prepare for the Passage to be initiated. Among them is Melancholia as it was her Reflection that was killed in Widow Hill. China meets with Jaron Gallow, who has the twelve names, but when she turns up at his car, she finds him dead, killed by Eliza, who has run off with the names.

Melancholia decides to test her powers as she suck's the life energy from everyone in the Ball. Valkyrie and Skulduggery, who were fortunate not to be there at the time, track the Necromancers into the Caves and they enter.

They run into Melancholia and Craven and Skulduggery challenges the Death Bringer to a battle. She easily defeats him and absorbs his life energy. However, by doing this, Lord Vile's armour is awakened. Valkyrie forces Melancholia to release Skulduggery's life energy. When she does, Skulduggery transforms into the real Lord Vile, forcing Valkyrie and Melancholia to flee. Valkyirie is kidnapped by monsters in the caves, but she breaks free and joins up with Melancholia again, who is accompanied by the White Cleaver. They bump into Scapegrace, who ends up with his head sliced off by the Cleaver. Vile catches up to them, and easily kills the White Cleaver, who was sent as a distraction, and Valkyrie and Melancholia continue to run and make it out of the caves. However, Vile catches up to them. Realising the only way to stop Vile, Valkyrie forces Melancholia to take her life energy away, which awakens Darquesse. Darquesse and Lord Vile start fighting all over Ireland, which involved both getting severely injured by crashes on streets and both gettings smashed through buildings, and also includes fighting on Liffey Bridge. Eventually the two begin talking after a long period of fighting, especially after Lord Vile is seeing Darquesse gets stronger the longer she's out.  He changes back after seeing defeat, and Skulduggery returns.  He talks to Darquesse, and Valkyrie returns as normal.

For their efforts, Valkyrie and Skulduggery are to be presented with medals at the Sanctuary. They decide to not show up and instead visit China, who told Skulduggery she has urgent news. When they arrive, they find Eliza beating up China. After she blows up China's library, Eliza reveals the truth behind the capture of Skulduggery's family. Shocked, Valkyrie and Skulduggery force Eliza to leave.  She complies, then Skulduggery and Valkyrie depart.

When Valkyrie arrives home, Caelan takes her to the docks and tries to force her to start listening to him. Annoyed, Valkyrie dumps Caelan who doesn't accept it. Fletcher teleports to them and starts beating up Caelan. Caelan transforms into a Vampire and nearly kills Fletcher, but him and Valkyrie manage to kill Caelan by forcing him into the river. As they teleport away, a shaken Kenny Dunne watches on with footage of the fight.

Characters

Valkyrie Cain

Skulduggery Pleasant

Melancholia St. Clair
Melancholia St. Clair is Vandameer Craven's disciple who seeks to embrace the mantle of "The Death Bringer" after Craven uses a series of sigils to loop her Surge.

Vandameer Craven
Vandameer Craven is Melancholia's mentor and one of three Clerics of the Necromancer Temple.

Solomon Wreath
Solomon Wreath is Valkyrie's mentor in Necromancy and Vandameer Craven's perceived rival.

Kenny Dunne
Kenny Dunne is an interviewer investigating rumours of sorcerers.

Eliza Scorn
Eliza Scorn is a collector of magical books and objects, and a devout follower of the Faceless Ones who blackmails China Sorrows with the intent of reestablishing the Church of the Faceless in their name.

Lord Vile
Lord Vile was an immensely powerful Necromancer and was one of the Three Generals for Mevolent. Lord Vile was also originally said to be the Death Bringer, the Messiah for the Necromancers, but was stripped of that title after he betrayed the Necromancers to serve under Mevolent, seemingly dying during the final year of the War Against Mevolent before his apparent return at the conclusion of Mortal Coil.

Darquesse
Darquesse is the True Name of Valkyrie Cain, a being serving as her link to the source of magic, the Remnants' messiah, and the foretold cause of the end of the world.

Caelan
Callan is a vampire with an obsession with Valkyrie after tasting her blood in Mortal Coil on Valkyrie's behest in an attempt to discover what Dusk had tasted in her blood in Dark Days that had disturbed him so greatly.

Reviews

Skulduggery Pleasant: Death Bringer has opened to largely positive reviews by critics.
 Sarah Webb (The Independent):
Landy is being feted as the new J. K. Rowling, and for good reason. Whatever your age, read them and enjoy the ride. As Skulduggery says: “Embrace your inner lunatic. Fun times guaranteed.”

 Joseph Melda (The Book Zone):
Derek Landy has created so many great characters, but what makes them stand out so much is the banter between them, and especially between his two main protagonists. It is consistently funny, occasionally poignant, and shows the deep bond that has grown between these two over the course of their adventures together.
 Rhys Wolfgang (ThirstForFiction):
Landy bring[s] an excellent compromise between the dry humour of Skulduggery and Valkyrie and the brutal nature of the story to create an intense bathos. Plenty of scenes are deliciously violent and hard-hitting, but these are offset by some hilarious jokes. The Skulduggery Pleasant series has always been something of a black comedy, but none of the previous novels have ever truly gotten such a fantastic contrast between the funny and the deadly[...] Few authors manage to outdo themselves with every book they publish, but Landy seems to be one of them. Skulduggery Pleasant: Death Bringer is above and beyond what anyone could have expected. With one epic saga of a storyline and with characters who are growing to be ever shady-er, Death Bringer is an excellent novel. I can only hope that Landy continues to write so fantastically well.
 Vesuvius Blotch (Blotch's Reviews):
Death Bringer is my choice for the most emotionally harrowing book of the series. And that’s saying something. From an overall perspective, the storyline showcases the Necromancers at their best and most formidable, a brilliant core storyline surrounded and framed by a multitude of juicy plotlines. Perhaps the book’s greatest strength lies in the development of Skulduggery and Valkyrie as characters. Both endure hardships during the story’s events, and their relationship, which has stood the test of time, is pushed to its very limits. There’s a miscellany of excellent moments[, a] compelling story, a ton of character work and an emotional roller-coaster. Classic.

References

External links

Skulduggery Pleasant UK, Australia and New Zealand Official Website
Skulduggery Pleasant US and Canada Official Website

2011 children's books
2011 Irish novels
HarperCollins books
Irish fantasy novels
Skulduggery Pleasant books